Trish Tipper (born 11 March 1946) is a British speed skater. She competed in two events at the 1968 Winter Olympics.

References

1946 births
Living people
British female speed skaters
Olympic speed skaters of Great Britain
Speed skaters at the 1968 Winter Olympics
Sportspeople from London